Commodore Edward Dudley Norman  (2 August 1910 – 1998, in Dorset) was a distinguished World War II submarine commander, senior Royal Navy officer and senior Royal Malayan Navy (now known as Royal Malaysian Navy) officer. He was the first Chief of Navy for Federation of Malaya (now known as Malaysia).

Early life 
Norman was born on 2 August 1910, in Burton Bradstock, to Alfred Headley Norman ( 1881;  1973), a Royal Navy Lieutenant (later Vice Admiral). Born into a naval family, Norman joined the Royal Navy as Cadet and later was commissioned as Lieutenant in 1934.

Military career

Royal Navy 
Norman was assigned to the Royal Navy Submarine Service and commanded six submarines throughout World War II. His mission with H44 was to conduct combat patrols in the North Sea. Under his command, H44 sank enemy shipping off the Norwegian coast, for which Norman was awarded the Distinguished Service Cross. He was then assigned to  until December 1940.

Norman was given a new task: to take command of the Malta-based submarine HMS Upright. He was then involved in the Siege of Malta with other Royal Navy submarines. Upright and the other submarines were later dubbed "The Fighting Tenth". Their story was documented in "The Fighting Tenth: The Tenth Submarine Flotilla and the Siege of Malta," a 2003 book by John Wingate. On 5 February 1941, Upright made a torpedo attack on an Italian convoy near Kerkenah, Tunisia. But the attack failed, and all four torpedoes fired missed their targets. The hunt for the enemy convoy continued, and on 23 February, Upright torpedoed and sank the Italian merchant ship, SS Silvia Tripcovich. Two days later, on 25 February, Upright attacked an Italian convoy. Upright managed to torpedo and sink the Italian cruiser Armando Diaz; however, they missed a bigger prize, a destroyer. Because of his success in attacking the enemy convoy and also the siege, Norman was awarded the Distinguished Service Order.

Norman then took command of a surrendered German Type VIIC U-boat, U-570, which had surrendered to an RAF Hudson aircraft south of Iceland in August. The submarine was then renamed . Norman commanded the Graph for one year, and from his experiences, he gave valuable information to the Allies' forces about the construction, performance, and weaponry of the standard Type VII submarine.

Norman left the Submarine Service in 1947 and was then appointed at the Admiralty in London and later as executive officer of HMS Heron (now known as RNAS Yeovilton), a naval air station, where he learned to fly. Norman later took command of HMS Nereide, a sloop on the South African Station.

Royal Malayan Navy 
Prior to 1957, Norman operated in the Southern Atlantic with the HMS Nereide. The Malayan government began purchasing Royal Navy minesweepers after gaining independence from the United Kingdom in 1957, and Norman was promoted to captain by the Royal Navy to assist the newly formed Royal Malayan Navy as the Commanding Officer of the Royal Malayan Navy, succeeding Captain H.E.H. Nicholls . On 1 July 1958, when the Malayan government gained complete control of the Royal Malayan Navy from the Royal Navy, Norman was lent to the new navy. Concurrently, the Malayan government promoted Norman to Commodore and appointed him as the first Chief of Navy.

Norman played a crucial role in setting up the future of the Royal Malayan Navy. All his setups helped Malayan a lot during the Indonesia–Malaysia confrontation. Under his command, Commodore Norman encourages the locals to take up important roles and officer positions in the Royal Malayan Navy. New recruiting plans are also implemented under him, causing many locals to want to join the navy.

Retirement from military 
Commodore E. D. Norman retired from the Royal Malayan Navy on 7 February 1960, and from the Royal Navy on 2 August 1960, with the respective ranks of Commodore (Royal Malayan Navy) and Captain (Royal Navy).

Honours 
Norman got numerous honours for his participation in World War II and the Malayan Emergency. His awards include the Distinguished Service Order (DSO), the Distinguished Service Cross (DSC), the Queen Elizabeth II Coronation Medal, the Active Service Medal (Malaya), and Pingat Jasa Malaysia (PJM).

Later work 
After his retirement, Norman became secretary of the Royal Malta Yacht Club and was involved in organising the first Whitbread Round-the-World Yacht Race (now known as the The Ocean Race).

References 

1910 births
1998 deaths
Royal Malaysian Navy personnel
Royal Navy submarine commanders
People from Dorset